The Mixed Breed Dog Clubs of America (MBDCA) is a registry for mixed-breed dogs in the United States.

The Mixed Breed Dog Clubs of America was founded in 1978 and began holding shows in the same year. The Mixed Breed Dog Clubs of America conducts a number of competitions, including conformation shows, obedience trials, lure coursing, tracking and other events. The club's conformation shows are judged against general soundness of type and temperament as opposed to a breed standard and prior to competing in any competitions a dog must be spayed or neutered and have successfully completed the club's obedience trials.

References

Organizations established in 1978
Dog organizations
1978 establishments in Washington (state)